Zhargalanta is a rural locality (an ulus) in Selenginsky District, Republic of Buryatia, Russia. The population was 935 as of 2010. There are 11 streets.

Geography 
Zhargalanta is located 22 km north of Gusinoozyorsk (the district's administrative centre) by road. Tokhoy is the nearest rural locality.

References 

Rural localities in Selenginsky District